Anthene lamias, the blotched ciliate blue, is a butterfly in the family Lycaenidae. It is found in Guinea, Sierra Leone, Liberia, Ivory Coast, Ghana, Togo, Nigeria, Cameroon, Gabon, the Republic of the Congo, the Democratic Republic of the Congo, Uganda, Kenya and Tanzania. The habitat consists of primary forests, the forest/Guinea savanna transition zone and secondary forests.

The larvae feed on Lecanium farquharsoni. They are green, with a darker and very indistinct dorsal line.

Subspecies
Anthene lamias lamias (Guinea, Sierra Leone, Liberia Ivory Coast, Ghana, Togo, Nigeria: south and Cross River loop, Cameroon, Gabon, Congo, western Democratic Republic of the Congo)
Anthene lamias katerae (d'Abrera, 1980) (eastern Democratic Republic of the Congo, Uganda, western Kenya, western Tanzania)

References

Butterflies described in 1878
Anthene
Butterflies of Africa
Taxa named by William Chapman Hewitson